Wissington or Wiston is a small village and former civil parish, now in the parish of Nayland-with-Wissington in the Babergh district, in south Suffolk, England. In 1881 the civil parish had a population of 191. On the 1 April 1844 it was merged to create Nayland-with-Wissington.

References

External links

Villages in Suffolk
Babergh District
Former civil parishes in Suffolk